The Macarao Formation (E2m) is a geological formation of the Cocinetas Basin in the northernmost Colombian department of La Guajira. The formation consists of foraminifera-rich fine to medium grained calcareous sandstones intercalated with calcareous siltstones, cross-cut by veins of gypsum.

Definition 
The formation was defined by Rollins in 1965.

Description

Lithologies 
The Macarao Formation consists of foraminifera-rich fine to medium grained calcareous sandstones intercalated with calcareous siltstones, cross-cut by veins of gypsum.

Stratigraphy and depositional environment 
The age has been estimated to be Middle to Late Eocene, corresponding to the Divisaderan in the South American land mammal ages (SALMA). The formation has been deposited in a shallow marine bay environment.

Petroleum geology 
The Macarao Formation is a reservoir rock formation in the Guajira Basin.

See also 

 Geology of the Eastern Hills
 Cesar-Ranchería Basin
 Bogotá Formation
 Chota, Loreto, Regadera, Soncco, Usme Formations

References

Bibliography

Maps 
 
 
 
 

Geologic formations of Colombia
Paleogene Colombia
Eocene Series of South America
Divisaderan
Bartonian Stage
Priabonian Stage
Sandstone formations
Siltstone formations
Shallow marine deposits
Reservoir rock formations
Paleontology in Colombia
Geography of La Guajira Department